Papakura City was a city near Auckland, New Zealand. It existed from 1975 to 1989.

History
Papakura City was constituted as a city on 1 January 1975. It existed until the 1989 local government reforms, when "Papakura City" was subsumed by "Papakura District". In the 1989 reform, Drury and Karaka were added to Papakura from the Franklin area, and Ardmore, Alfriston and Takanini (including Conifer Grove) were added from Manukau City.

References

Auckland Region
Territorial authorities of New Zealand
Populated places established in 1975
Populated places disestablished in 1989
Geography of Auckland
History of Auckland
Former subdivisions of the Auckland Region